Anenská Studánka is a municipality and village in Ústí nad Orlicí District in the Pardubice Region of the Czech Republic. It has about 200 inhabitants.

Administrative parts
The hamlet of Helvíkov is an administrative part of Anenská Studánka.

Geography
It lies in the Podorlická Uplands.

History
The first written mention of Anenská Studánka is from 1292, when it was owned by the Zbraslav Monastery.

Sights
The landmark of Anenská Studánka is the Church of Saint Lawrence. It was built in 1907, on the site of an old church from 1607.

References

External links

Villages in Ústí nad Orlicí District